Zuzanna Smykała (born 10 January 1990 in Chorzów) is a Polish snowboarder. She competed for Poland in the snowboard cross at the 2018 Winter Olympics, finishing 23rd in qualifying and fifth in Heat 4, eliminating her from the competition. Smykała had previously finished seventh in the snowboard cross at the 2015 Winter Universiade.

References

1990 births
Olympic snowboarders of Poland
Snowboarders at the 2018 Winter Olympics
Polish female snowboarders
Living people
Sportspeople from Chorzów
Universiade bronze medalists for Poland
Universiade medalists in snowboarding
Competitors at the 2015 Winter Universiade
21st-century Polish women